The 2021 Seattle Sounders FC season was the club's thirty-eighth year of existence, and their thirteenth season in Major League Soccer, the top flight of American soccer. The team was under the management of Brian Schmetzer in his fifth full MLS season as head coach of the Sounders. Seattle were the reigning Western Conference champions and lost to Columbus Crew SC in the MLS Cup 3–0.

Due to the COVID-19 pandemic, the capacity of Lumen Field was limited to 7,000 in March and increase in stages. The stadium's full capacity was restored in July with the addition of COVID-19 testing and vaccination requirements.

The Sounders finished second in the Western Conference and qualified for the 2022 CONCACAF Champions League as a result. They were also runners-up in the 2021 Leagues Cup, losing to Club León in the final.

Background

The Sounders lost the MLS Cup at Mapfre Stadium to Columbus Crew SC 3–0. The team is set to play in the Leagues Cup, along with regular MLS and U.S. Open Cup matches.

Recap

Final roster

Out on loan

Competitions

Preseason

Major League Soccer

League tables

Western Conference

Overall

Results

MLS Cup Playoffs

Leagues Cup

U.S. Open Cup

Statistics

Appearances and goals

Numbers after plus-sign(+) denote appearances as a substitute.

|-
! colspan=14 style=background:#dcdcdc; text-align:center| Goalkeepers

|-
! colspan=14 style=background:#dcdcdc; text-align:center| Defenders

|-
! colspan=14 style=background:#dcdcdc; text-align:center| Midfielders

|-
! colspan=14 style=background:#dcdcdc; text-align:center| Forwards

|-
! colspan=14 style=background:#dcdcdc; text-align:center| Players transferred/loaned out during the season

[TAC] – Defiance player

Top scorers
{| class="wikitable" style="font-size: 95%; text-align: center;"
|-
!width=30|Rank
!width=30|Position
!width=30|Number
!width=175|Name
!width=75|
!width=75|
!width=75|
!width=75|
!width=75|Total
|-
|1
|FW
|9
|align="left"| Raúl Ruidíaz
|17
|0
|0
|2
|19
|-
|rowspan="1"|2
|FW
|12
|align="left"| Fredy Montero
|7
|0
|0
|1
|8
|-
|rowspan="1"|3
|MF
|7
|align="left"| Cristian Roldan
|6
|0
|0
|1
|7
|-
|rowspan="2"|4
|MF
|20
|align="left"| Nicolas Benezet
|3
|0
|0
|1
|4
|-
|DF
|94
|align="left"| Jimmy Medranda
|4
|0
|0
|0
|4
|-
|rowspan="3"|6
|MF
|6
|align="left"| João Paulo
|3
|0
|0
|0
|3
|-
|DF
|11
|align="left"| Brad Smith
|3
|0
|0
|0
|3
|-
|FW
|17
|align="left"| Will Bruin
|3
|0
|0
|0
|3
|-
|rowspan="1"|9
|DF
|3
|align="left"| Xavier Arreaga
|2
|0
|0
|0
|2
|-
|rowspan="6"|10
|MF
|10
|align="left"| Nicolás Lodeiro
|0
|0
|0
|1
|1
|-
|DF
|16
|align="left"| Alex Roldan
|1
|0
|0
|0
|1
|-
|MF
|22
|align="left"| Kelyn Rowe
|1
|0
|0
|0
|1
|-
|MF
|23
|align="left"| Léo Chú
|1
|0
|0
|0
|1
|-
|DF
|27
|align="left"| Shane O'Neill
|1
|0
|0
|0
|1
|-
|DF
|28
|align="left"| Yeimar Gómez Andrade
|1
|0
|0
|0
|1
|-

Top assists
{| class="wikitable" style="font-size: 95%; text-align: center;"
|-
!width=30|Rank
!width=30|Position
!width=30|Number
!width=175|Name
!width=75|
!width=75|
!width=75|
!width=75|
!width=75|Total
|-
|rowspan="1"|1
|MF
|6
|align="left"| João Paulo
|8
|0
|0
|1
|9
|-
|rowspan="5"|2
|MF
|7
|align="left"| Cristian Roldan
|1
|0
|0
|2
|3
|-
|DF 
|11
|align="left"| Brad Smith
|3
|0
|0
|0
|3
|-
|FW
|12
|align="left"| Fredy Montero
|3
|0
|0
|0
|3
|-
|DF 
|16
|align="left"| Alex Roldan
|3
|0
|0
|0
|3
|-
|DF 
|94
|align="left"| Jimmy Medranda
|3
|0
|0
|0
|3
|-
|rowspan="1"|7
|FW
|17
|align="left"| Will Bruin
|2
|0
|0
|0
|2
|-
|rowspan="4"|8
|DF 
|5
|align="left"| Nouhou
|1
|0
|0
|0
|1
|-
|FW
|9
|align="left"| Raúl Ruidíaz
|1
|0
|0
|0
|1
|-
|MF 
|84
|align="left"| Josh Atencio
|1
|0
|0
|0
|1
|-

Disciplinary record
{| class="wikitable" style="text-align:center;"
|-
| rowspan="2" !width=15|
| rowspan="2" !width=15|
| rowspan="2" !width=120|Player
| colspan="3"|MLS
| colspan="3"|U.S. Open Cup
| colspan="3"|MLS Playoffs
| colspan="3"|Leagues Cup
| colspan="3"|Total
|-
!width=34; background:#fe9;|
!width=34; background:#fe9;|
!width=34; background:#ff8888;|
!width=34; background:#fe9;|
!width=34; background:#fe9;|
!width=34; background:#ff8888;|
!width=34; background:#fe9;|
!width=34; background:#fe9;|
!width=34; background:#ff8888;|
!width=34; background:#fe9;|
!width=34; background:#fe9;|
!width=34; background:#ff8888;|
!width=34; background:#fe9;|
!width=34; background:#fe9;|
!width=34; background:#ff8888;|

|-
|-
|| 3 || |DF ||align=left| Xavier Arreaga || |5|| |0|| |0|| |0|| |0|| |0|| |0|| |0|| |0|||0|| |0|| |0|| |5|| |0|| |0
|-
|| 5 || |DF ||align=left| Nouhou || |2|| |0|| |0|| |0|| |0|| |0|| |0|| |0|| |0|||0|| |0|| |0|| |2|| |0|| |0
|-
|| 6 || |MF ||align=left| João Paulo || |5|| |0|| |0|| |0|| |0|| |0|| |0|| |0|| |0|||0|| |0|| |0|| |5|| |0|| |0
|-
|| 7 || |MF ||align=left| Cristian Roldan || |1|| |0|| |0|| |0|| |0|| |0|| |0|| |0|| |0|||0|| |0|| |0|| |1|| |0|| |0
|-
|| 8 || |MF ||align=left| Jordy Delem || |1|| |0|| |0|| |0|| |0|| |0|| |0|| |0|| |0|||0|| |0|| |0|| |1|| |0|| |0
|-
|| 9 || |FW ||align=left| Raúl Ruidíaz || |4|| |0|| |0|| |0|| |0|| |0|| |0|| |0|| |0|||0|| |0|| |0|| |4|| |0|| |0
|-
|| 10 || |MF ||align=left| Nicolás Lodeiro || |0|| |0|| |0|| |0|| |0|| |0|| |0|| |0|| |0|||1|| |0|| |0|| |1|| |0|| |0
|-
|| 11 || |DF ||align=left| Brad Smith || |1|| |0|| |0|| |0|| |0|| |0|| |0|| |0|| |0|||0|| |0|| |0|| |1|| |0|| |0
|-
|| 16 || |DF ||align=left| Alex Roldan || |2|| |0|| |0|| |0|| |0|| |0|| |0|| |0|| |0|||0|| |0|| |0|| |2|| |0|| |0
|-
|| 22 || |MF ||align=left| Kelyn Rowe || |0|| |0|| |0|| |0|| |0|| |0|| |0|| |0|| |0|||1|| |0|| |0|| |1|| |0|| |0
|-
|| 27 || |DF ||align=left| Shane O'Neill || |1|| |0|| |0|| |0|| |0|| |0|| |0|| |0|| |0|||0|| |0|| |0|| |1|| |0|| |0
|-
|| 28 || |DF ||align=left| Yeimar Gómez Andrade || |4|| |0|| |0|| |0|| |0|| |0|| |0|| |0|| |0|||0|| |0|| |0|| |4|| |0|| |0
|-
|| 45 || |MF ||align=left| Ethan Dobbelaere || |1|| |0|| |0|| |0|| |0|| |0|| |0|| |0|| |0|||0|| |0|| |0|| |1|| |0|| |0
|-
|| 75 || |MF ||align=left| Danny Leyva || |3|| |0|| |0|| |0|| |0|| |0|| |0|| |0|| |0|||0|| |0|| |0|| |3|| |0|| |0
|-
|| 84 || |MF ||align=left| Josh Atencio || |1|| |0|| |0|| |0|| |0|| |0|| |0|| |0|| |0|||0|| |0|| |0|| |1|| |0|| |0
|-
|| 94 || |DF ||align=left| Jimmy Medranda || |1|| |0|| |0|| |0|| |0|| |0|| |0|| |0|| |0|||0|| |0|| |0|| |1|| |0|| |0
|-
|| 98 || |FW ||align=left| Samuel Adeniran [TAC] || |1|| |0|| |0|| |0|| |0|| |0|| |0|| |0|| |0|||0|| |0|| |0|| |1|| |0|| |0 
|-
|-
!colspan=3|Total !!33!!0!!0!!0!!0!!0!!0!!0!!0!!2!!0!!0!!35!!0!!0

Honors and awards

MLS Team of the Week

Italics indicates MLS Player of the Week

MLS Goal of the Week

MLS Save of the Year

MLS Best XI

Transfers

For transfers in, dates listed are when Sounders FC officially signed the players to the roster. Transactions where only the rights to the players are acquired are not listed. For transfers out, dates listed are when Sounders FC officially removed the players from its roster, not when they signed with another club. If a player later signed with another club, his new club will be noted, but the date listed here remains the one when he was officially removed from Sounders FC roster.

In

Draft picks

Draft picks are not automatically signed to the team roster. Only those who are signed to a contract will be listed as transfers in. Only trades involving draft picks and executed after the start of 2021 MLS SuperDraft will be listed in the notes.

Out

Notes
A.  Players who are under contract with Tacoma Defiance.

References

Seattle Sounders FC seasons
Seattle Sounders
Seattle
Seattle
Seattle Sounders